Arthur Hutchinson may refer to:

 Arthur Hutchinson (mineralogist) (1866–1937), British mineralogist
 Sir Arthur Hutchinson (civil servant) (1896–1981), British soldier and civil servant
 Arthur Hutchinson (murderer) (born 1941), British convicted triple murderer
 Arthur Hutchinson (footballer) (1903–1951), Australian rules footballer
 Arthur Hutchinson (dentist) (1889–1969), British professor of dentistry
 Arthur Stuart-Menteth Hutchinson (1879–1971), British novelist
 Arthur Hutchinson (-1927), editor, the Windsor Magazine